143 is a 2004 Indian Telugu-language romantic action film directed, written, and produced by Puri Jagannadh, starring Sairam Shankar and Samiksha in the lead roles. Nagendra Babu, Brahmanandam, Dharmavarapu Subramanyam, Asha Saini, Brahmaji, M. S. Narayana and Ali play supporting roles.

The film was released on 27 August 2004. The movie introduces Sairam Shankar, brother of director Puri Jagannadh as the lead actor. The soundtrack of the movie was composed by Indian music director Chakri.

Plot
Siddu (Sairam Shankar) is a carefree boy-next-door. Sanjana (Samiksha) is a doting sister of four elder brothers. Siddu is like a family member in Sanjana's household. One fine day, Sanjana elopes with Siddu. And fate separates them. Sanjana goes into the protective hands of naxalites. Siddu lands up in the house of a journalist (Flora Saini). Siddu thinks Sanjana is dead. Sanjana thinks Siddu is no more. The rest of the story is all about how fate unites them again.

Cast

Sairam Shankar as  Siddhu
Samiksha as Sanjana
Asha Saini as TV Reporter
Nagendra Babu as DGP
Brahmanandam
Ali
Brahmaji as Police
Satya Prakash as Naxalite Leader
Mallikarjuna Rao as Doctor
M. S. Narayana as Patient
Dharmavarapu Subramanyam
Venu Madhav
Uttej
Hema
Rajitha
Anand

Soundtrack

References

External links

2000s Telugu-language films
2004 films
2000s romantic action films
Films directed by Puri Jagannadh
Films scored by Chakri
Indian romantic action films
Films about Naxalism